Oxyna parva is a species of fruit fly in the family Tephritidae.

Distribution
China.

References

Tephritinae
Insects described in 1938
Diptera of Asia